Lee Won-guk is a Korean name consisting of the family name Lee and the given name Won-guk, and may also refer to:

 Ernesto Carlos (born 1948), South Korean baseball player
 Won Kuk Lee (1907-2002), South Korean karateka